Flamenco is a 1931 novel by the British writer Eleanor Smith.

References

Bibliography
 Vinson, James. Twentieth-Century Romance and Gothic Writers. Macmillan, 1982.

1931 British novels
Novels by Lady Eleanor Smith
British romance novels
Victor Gollancz Ltd books
Bobbs-Merrill Company books